Lázaro Vinícius Marques (born 12 March 2002), commonly known as Lázaro, is Brazilian who plays as a forward for La Liga club Almería.

Club career

Flamengo
Born in Belo Horizonte, Lázaro began his career with Flamengo and made his professional debut for the club on 27 September 2020 against Palmeiras. He came on as a 79th minute substitute for Lincoln as Flamengo drew the match 1–1.

Lázaro scored his first professional goals on 27 January 2022, netting a brace in a 2–1 Campeonato Carioca home win over Portuguesa-RJ. His first goal in the top tier came on 21 July, as he scored his team's fourth in a 4–0 home routing of Juventude.

Almería
On 1 September 2022, Lázaro moved abroad and joined La Liga club Almería on a six-year contract, for a rumoured € 7 million fee, with Flamengo keeping 30% of a future transfer.

International career
Lázaro made his debut for Brazil at the under-17 level on 12 March 2017 against the United States U17.

Career statistics

Honours

Club
Flamengo
Campeonato Brasileiro Série A: 2020
Campeonato Carioca: 2021

International
Brazil U17
FIFA U-17 World Cup: 2019

References

External links

2002 births
Living people
Footballers from Belo Horizonte
Brazilian footballers
Association football forwards
CR Flamengo footballers
UD Almería players
Campeonato Brasileiro Série A players
Brazil youth international footballers
Brazilian expatriate footballers
Brazilian expatriate sportspeople in Spain
Expatriate footballers in Spain